″Cradle to the Grave″ is a song by American hip hop recording artist 2Pac and his group, Thug Life, released on November 4, 1994 as a single from their one and only album, Thug Life Vol. 1 (1994). It is one of the few songs from the album that made it to the charts, peaking at number 25 on the Billboard Hot Rap Singles and number 91 on the Billboard Hot R&B/Hip-Hop Singles & Tracks charts respectively.

Music video
The music video begins with 2Pac speaking alongside the chorus, and then begins his verse in alternating scenes, first in prison, being followed by a guard (with the rest of Thug Life tagging along right behind 2Pac), followed by a scene of him behind holographic bars (depicting that he's in a cell), and then outside in his neighborhood. Mopreme also does his verse in different scenes in the same order. The Rated R, though, begins behind a scene of him behind holographic bars, and then alternating with that scene and in a prison facility. Macadoshis also began his verse similarly (behind holographic bars), but this time the scene alternates from him speaking from inside prison to the rest of his family from a jail phone and another scene in his neighborhood, as well as the aforementioned scene behind bars. Big Syke begins his verse in the prison work-out room, and alternates between this scene and a scene of him also behind holographic bars. The music video takes one more last scene at the neighborhood, and finally cuts to the ending scene of 2Pac and the rest of Thug Life rejoicing behind the holographic jail cell bars. The music video was released for the week ending on November 13, 1994.

Charts

Weekly charts

Track listing 
 A1. Cradle to the Grave (Moe-Z Radio Version)
 A2. Cradle to the Grave (Moe-Z Clean Version)
 A3. Cradle to the Grave (Moe-Z Album Version)
 A4. Cradle to the Grave (Moe-Z Instrumental)
 B1. Shit Don't Stop (featuring Y?N-Vee)
 B2. Cradle to the Grave (Professor Jay & Syke Version)
 B3. Cradle to the Grave (Madukey Mix)
 B4. Cradle to the Grave (Madukey Mix Instrumental)

References

1994 songs
1994 singles
1990s ballads
Tupac Shakur songs
Mopreme Shakur songs
G-funk songs
Interscope Records singles
Songs written by Tupac Shakur
Gangsta rap songs
Songs about prison